Walter Harold "Harry" Leigh (1888 – after 1912) was an English footballer who played for Barnsley and Stoke.

Career
Leigh was born in Lymm and began his career with Aston Villa but he left for Barnsley without making an appearance. He played once for the "Tykes" in 1909 before being released and Leigh signed for Southern League side Stoke in 1909. In his first season with the club he played 47 times scoring 10 goals and in his second played 19 times scoring once. He later played for Winsford United.

Career statistics
Source:

References

1888 births
Year of death missing
People from Lymm
English footballers
Association football outside forwards
Aston Villa F.C. players
Barnsley F.C. players
Stoke City F.C. players
Winsford United F.C. players
English Football League players